Wenzel Krumpholz or Václav Krumpholz (1750 – May 2, 1817) was a Czech-born musician who played mandolin and violin. He studied the mandolin at an early age and became one of the most renowned performers on this instrument. At a later date he adopted the violin also, for in 1796 he was one of the first violins in the orchestra of the Court Opera, Vienna.

Born in Zlonice, near Kladno, now part of the Czech Republic, Krumpholz was the son of a bandmaster in a French regiment who lived in Paris during childhood, learning music from his father. His brother, Johann Baptist Krumpholz, was also a musician, a celebrated harpist and composer.

According to music historian Philip J. Bone, there was a strong friendship between Wenzel Krumpholz and Ludwig van Beethoven. Bone talked about the relationship between Krumpholz and Beethoven in his book The Guitar and Mandolin. He said that Krumpholz's name was "immortalized by his intimacy with Beethoven, who was exceedingly fond of him, and who used to jokingly call him mein Narr (my fool)."

He talked about what men in the music business had to say about the Beethoven-Krumpholz friendship: according to Ferdinand Ries, Krumpholz gave Beethoven instruction on the violin when in Vienna and it is most probable that he gave instruction on the mandolin. Carl Czerny said in his autobiography that it was Krumpholz who had introduced him to Beethoven, and that Krumpholz was one of the first to recognize Beethoven's genius and inspired others with his own enthusiasm.

Bone said that Krumpholz frequently played the mandolin to Beethoven and indicated that it influenced Beethoven to write music for the instrument. He talked about research done by Dominco Artaria, who had bought a Skizzenbook, containing sketches of some of Beethoven's music. Artaria stated in his Aittographische Skizze that Beethoven intended to write a sonata for mandolin and pianoforte for Krumpholz. This composition is the one sketched in Beethoven's note book (preserved as (No. 29,801) in the manuscript department of the British Museum) and it was first made public by Breitkopf and Hartel, Leipzig.

On the day following Krumpholz's death in Vienna, Beethoven composed the Gesang der Mönche from Schiller's William Tell, for three men's voices "in commemoration of the sudden and unexpected death of our Krumpholz". Only two of Krumpholz's compositions were printed.

He taught Jean-Joseph Benoit Pollet the mandolin. That same student learned harp from his brother Jean-Baptiste Krumpholz.

Published compositions
Abendunterhaltung for a single violin
Ein Viertelstunde for a single violin

References

External links
Wikisource page from Dictionary of Music and Musicians.
Book with information for this article
More material for the article

1750 births
1817 deaths
German Classical-period composers
German mandolinists
Czech classical mandolinists
Czech classical violinists
German classical violinists
Male classical violinists
German violinists
German male violinists
Czech classical composers
Czech male classical composers
German male classical composers
People from Kladno District
18th-century classical composers
18th-century German composers
18th-century German male musicians
19th-century German male musicians